The thon and rammana are hand drums played as a pair in Thai classical music. It consists of two drums: the thon (โทน), a goblet drum with a ceramic or wooden body and the rammana (รำมะนา), a small rebana-typed frame drum or tambourine. They are used usually in the khruang sai ensemble. The thon gives a low pitch and the rammana gives a high pitch.
Earlier in the 20th century, the thon and rammana were sometimes played separately.

The instruments are also used in Cambodian music in the mohori ensemble.

See also
Skor daey, article compares Cambodian goblet drums
Traditional Thai musical instruments
Cambodian folk and classical music, mohori

References

External links
Thon and rammana page
UNESCO document, Traditional Musical Instruments of Cambodia. PDF..

Thai musical instruments
Cambodian musical instruments
Hand drums
Goblet-shaped drums

th:โทน